Acting age is an age, or range of ages, that an actor lists on his or her résumé. It is not a claim to an actual chronological age, but a suggestion as to what age or ages the actor considers themselves capable of credibly portraying.

Notable examples
 Stacey Dash, who played a 17-year-old in both the movie and TV versions of Clueless until the age of 32.
 Estelle Getty, who played the mother of Beatrice Arthur on The Golden Girls who was actually younger than Arthur.
 Sidney Poitier played a teenager in Blackboard Jungle when he was 28.
 Gabrielle Carteris played a 16- to 21-year-old on Beverly Hills, 90210 when she was ages 29 to 34.

Age